Amblyseius subpassiflorae is a species of mite in the family Phytoseiidae.

References

subpassiflorae
Articles created by Qbugbot
Animals described in 1989